Dinosaur vision was, in general, better than the vision of most other reptiles, although vision varied between dinosaur species. Coelurosaurs, for example, had good stereoscopic or binocular vision, whereas large carnosaurs had poor binocular vision, comparable to that of modern alligators.

Theropoda

Allosauroidea
Allosauroids, including Carcharodontosaurus and Allosaurus, did not have very good binocular vision, comparable to modern crocodiles. They possessed binocular vision which was restricted to a region only 20° wide, which is understandable, as they hunted mostly large and slow prey. Their keenest sense was probably smell.

Deinonychosauria
The binocular vision of deinonychosaurs, such as Velociraptor and Stenonychosaurus was better than that of allosauroids and it matched or exceeded that of extant predatory birds. Their binocular field was up to 60°.

Tyrannosauridae
The position of the eyes of tyrannosaurids suggests that they had a very well developed sense of vision. Combined with the shape of the head they had better binocular vision than allosauroids. The eye position of Tyrannosaurus rex was similar to that of modern humans, but their eyes and optic lobe were much larger than that of modern humans. T. rex, unlike most dinosaurs, had a combination of powerful eyesight and a great sense of smell. The binocular vision of Daspletosaurus has been found to be less than that of Stenonychosaurus, but more than that of Gorgosaurus.

Ceratosauria
Ceratosaurs had eyes placed closer to the side. This widened their field of vision, but decreased their depth perception.

Ornithischia

Pachycephalosauria
Pachycephalosaurs, like most of the plant-eaters, had eyes on the sides of the head, so they could quickly spot approaching predators. They also had better depth perception than most other dinosaurs

References

External links
 Interactive Dracorex skull
 Dinosaur senses in Australian Museum
 Dinosaur vision, BBC, 10 December 2010.

Dinosaur paleobiology
Vision by taxon